Ingeborg Steffens (October 3, 1907 – April 27, 1982) was a Norwegian actress.

Steffens was born in Kristiania (now Oslo), Norway. She was the daughter of Major General William Steffens (1880–1964) and Anette Eger (1884–1944). She was the first wife of the actor Georg Richter.

Steffens was engaged at the Oslo New Theater from 1930 to 1947. Steffens made her film debut in 1951 in Astrid Henning-Jensen's film Kranes konditori and then starred in Ukjent mann (1951) and Andrine og Kjell (1952).

Filmography
1951: Kranes konditori as Miss Sønstegård
1951: Ukjent mann as Miss Unstad
1952: Andrine og Kjell as Mrs. Borck

References

External links
 
 Ingeborg Steffens at the Swedish Film Database
 Ingeborg Steffens at Filmfront
 Ingeborg Steffens at Sceneweb

1907 births
1982 deaths
20th-century Norwegian actresses
Actresses from Oslo